The Madira Bickel Mound State Archaeological Site is an archaeological site on Terra Ceia Island in northwestern Palmetto, Florida, United States. It is located on Bayshore Drive, west of U.S. 19, a mile south of I-275. On August 12, 1970, it was added to the U.S. National Register of Historic Places. It is also a Florida State Park.

The  site was the first Native American location in Florida to be designated as a State Archaeological Site.

History
Archaeological excavations have established that indigenous occupation reaches back 2,000 years, and across three distinct periods: Manasota, Weedon Island, and Safety Harbor cultures. The people constructed a massive earthwork temple/ceremonial mound from shells, sand and detritus.

Scholars believe that the mound site continued to be of great ceremonial importance to the historic Tocobaga Indians of the surrounding area, who coalesced as a people before European encounter in the late sixteenth century. They survived into the eighteenth century, but disappeared as a tribe due to infectious diseases and warfare.

The site is named for Madira Bickel of Sarasota. She and her husband, Karl, purchased the land around the main mound and donated it to the state in 1948.

The mounds

The state park has graduated stairways for access, and at the top, has cleared an area (protected by a fence) for overlooking the park. Over the centuries, the mound has become covered with vegetation, including tall trees.

It was used through the three major archaeological cultures described above, from 800-1500 AD. Since settlement and development, much of the mound's contents have been disturbed.

References

External links
 Madira Bickel Mounds State Archaeological Site at Florida State Parks
 Manatee County listings,  Florida's Office of Cultural and Historical Programs
 "Madira Bickel Temple Mound Site", School District of Manatee County
 Madira Bickel Mound Photograph Gallery, Florida Center for Instructional Technology, University of South Florida

Archaeological sites on the National Register of Historic Places in Florida
National Register of Historic Places in Manatee County, Florida
Parks in Manatee County, Florida
Protected areas established in 1970
State parks of Florida
Florida Native American Heritage Trail
Mounds in Florida
1970 establishments in Florida